Witheringia is a genus of flowering plants in the family Solanaceae, with a neotropical distribution. It is closely related to Physalis.

Species
Currently accepted species include:
Witheringia allogona (Schltdl.) Miers
Witheringia asterotricha (Standl.) Hunz.
Witheringia bristaniana D'Arcy
Witheringia coccoloboides (Dammer) Hunz.
Witheringia conspersa (Miers) Miers
Witheringia correana D'Arcy
Witheringia glabrata (Miers) Miers
Witheringia hunzikeri D'Arcy
Witheringia killipiana Hunz.
Witheringia laxissima (Standl.) D'Arcy
Witheringia maculata (Standl. & C.V.Morton) Hunz.
Witheringia meiantha (Donn.Sm.) Hunz.
Witheringia mexicana (B.L.Rob.) Hunz.
Witheringia mortonii Hunz.
Witheringia pogonandra Lem.
Witheringia solanacea L'Hér.
Witheringia stellata (Greenm.) Hunz.
Witheringia wurdackiana Benítez

References

Solanaceae
Solanaceae genera